Dacian, Geto-Dacian, Daco-Getic or Daco-Getian often refers to something of or relating to:
 Dacia (disambiguation)
 Dacians
 Dacian language

Dacian may also refer to:
 Dacian archaeology
 Dacian art
 Dacia in art
 Dacian culture
 Dacian deities
 Dacian goddesses
 Dacian gods
 Dacian mythology
 Dacian names
 Dacian sites
 Dacian bracelets, bracelets associated with the ancient peoples known as the Dacians, a particularly individualized branch of the Thracians
 Dacian kings
 Dacian towns, settlements and fortified towns
 Dacian tribes
 Dacian warfare, spans from c. 10th century BC up to the 2nd century AD in the region defined by Ancient Greek and Latin historians as Dacia
 Dacian weapons
 Domitian's Dacian War, a conflict between the Roman Empire and the Dacian Kingdom
 Trajan's Dacian Wars, two military campaigns fought between the Roman Empire and Dacia during Roman Emperor Trajan's rule

It may also refer to:
 Daco-Roman, the Romanized culture of Dacia under the rule of the Roman Empire
 Daco-Romanian, the term used to identify the Romanian language in contexts where distinction needs to be made between the various Eastern Romance languages (Daco-Romanian, Aromanian, Istro-Romanian, and Megleno-Romanian)
 Roman Dacia, a province of the Roman Empire (106-271/275 AD)
 (obsolete), A Dane, Denmark having been known as Dacia in Medieval Latin

People 
 Dacian (prefect), 4th-century Roman prefect who persecuted Christians, including Caprasius of Agen and Saint Maginus
 Dacian Cioloș, Romanian engineer and politician
 Dacian Varga, Romanian footballer

Language and nationality disambiguation pages
Romanian masculine given names